Otterburn is an unincorporated community located in Amelia County, in the U.S. state of Virginia. It is located just south of Amelia Court House, Virginia and was a stop on the Richmond and Danville Railroad.

References

Unincorporated communities in Virginia
Unincorporated communities in Amelia County, Virginia